is one of syllable in Javanese script that represent the sound /jɔ/, /ja/. It is transliterated to Latin as "ya", and sometimes in Indonesian orthography as "yo".

Pasangan 
Its pasangan form , is located on the bottom side of the previous syllable. The pasangan only occurs if a word is ended with a consonant, and the next word starts with 'y', for example  - anak yuyu (little crab). If it is located between a consonant and a vocal, it didn't form a pasangan, instead it uses a special panjingan called a pengkal, for example  - ampyang (a kind of snack).

Murda 
The letter ꦪ doesn't have a murda form.

Glyphs

Unicode block 

Javanese script was added to the Unicode Standard in October, 2009 with the release of version 5.2.

References 

Javanese script